Saqra Mach'ay (Quechua saqra malignant, pernicious, bad, bad tempered, wicked; restless; devil, synonym of supay, mach'ay cave, hispanicized spelling Sagramachay) is a mountain in the Andes of Peru, about  high. It is located in the Pasco Region, Daniel Alcides Carrión Province, Yanahuanca District. Saqra Mach'ay lies southwest of Puka Mach'ay ("red cave").

References

Mountains of Peru
Mountains of Pasco Region